Aberfeldie Park is a cricket ground in Essendon, a suburb of Melbourne, Australia. It is the home of the Aberfeldie Park Cricket Club, and hosted several Rose Bowl series Women's One Day International cricket matches during the winter of 1984–85.

Aberfeldie Park has won the VTCA ground of the year in the 2001/2 season as well as being awarded curator of the year in the 2014/15 season. Aberfeldie Park Cricket Club also produced Paul Hibbert who played one test for Australia in the 1977–78 season.

Notes

External links
 Aberfeldie Park Cricket Club
 Ground Profile: Aberfeldie Park from CricInfo

Cricket grounds in Australia
Sports venues in Melbourne